The Bonomi I government of Italy held office from 4 July 1921 until 26 February 1922, a total of 237 days, or 7 months and 22 days.

Government parties
The government was composed by the following parties:

Composition

References

Italian governments
1921 establishments in Italy
1922 disestablishments in Italy